Mohamedia-Fouchana is a municipality in the Ben Arous Governorate, Tunisia. It consists of the towns of Mohamedia and Fouchana which are however the seats of distinct governoral delegations.

References

Populated places in Tunisia